The Perseus–Pisces Supercluster (SCl 40) is one of the largest known structures in the universe. Even at a distance of 250 million light-years, this chain of galaxy clusters extends more than 40° across the northern winter sky. The Perseus-Pisces Supercluster is one of two dominant concentrations of galaxies (the other being the Local supercluster) in the nearby universe (within 300 million light years). This supercluster also borders a prominent void, the Taurus Void, and is part of the Perseus–Pegasus Filament which stretches for roughly a billion light years.

Clusters
The main clusters of the Perseus–Pisces Supercluster are Abell 262, Abell 347, and Abell 426.

See also
 Abell catalogue
 Large-scale structure of the universe
 List of Abell clusters
 Supercluster

References

External links
 Atlas of the universe page on the Perseus-Pisces Supercluster

 
Pisces–Cetus Supercluster Complex
Galaxy superclusters